The Phoenix Partnership (Leeds) Ltd (TPP) is a software company based in Horsforth, Leeds. It develops and supplies clinical software including SystmOne.

History
The partnership was formed in 1997 by Frank Hester, a computer programmer married to a GP, to create a patient-record storing system that would help GPs after witnessing his wife's "constant struggle with the lack of connectivity and integration between NHS services". The system that was created, SystmOne, was developed the following year as a clinical IT system that linked a GP practice and a diabetes service in Bradford, UK.

Growth
By 2012, TPP's SystmOne held enough patient records that it could be used as a research database. In partnership with the University of Leeds and the UK Government's Technology Strategy Board, in May TPP launched ResearchOne as a not-for-profit health and care research database.

The company significantly increased its market opportunities when the then prime minister, David Cameron, invited it on trading missions to both India and China in 2013. By January the following year, it signed its first memorandum of understanding with a Chinese province, the Zhejiang provincial centre for disease prevention and control. In 2016, the company signed its first contract in the Middle East when it agreed with Qatari Integrated Intelligence Services to deliver SystmOne to the private healthcare sector across Qatar, including approximately 300 primary care sites.

In 2015, TPP attracted the attention of the prime minister, David Cameron, who visited the in-progress building site of new TPP head office. Cameron gave a speech saying, "What [TPP] is doing here is incredible… Companies like TPP keep the UK at the forefront of innovation… TPP is an example of a great British business with immense potential." The significance of its  work was reiterated in the same year when its CEO, Frank Hester, received an OBE for his contribution to healthcare in the UK.

Data breaches 
In 2017, the SystmOne was found to have serious compliance concerns by the Information Commissioner's Office (ICO). This affected 2,700 GP practices in the UK and a new data-sharing feature in the software.

Between March 2015 and June 2018, another breach due to the SystmOne software occurred affecting the data of 150,000 patients. This shared the data of patients who had made a type 2 opt-out (which meant they did not allow their data to be used for anything other than their own clinical care). TPP offered an unreserved apology for the breach and is currently under investigation by the ICO. A statement to parliament regarding the breach was read out by the health minister and patients were informed by letter.

Awards 
HIMSS Best Hospital IT solution 2022 for SystmOne, Airmid and Brigid.

References

External links

Electronic health record software companies
Private providers of NHS services
Companies based in Leeds